The Church of the Holy Cross is a Roman Catholic church located in Bordeaux, southern France.

It was formerly the church of a Benedictine abbey founded in the 7th century, and was built in the late 11th-early 12th centuries. The façade is in the Romanesque architectural style.

The church has a nave and four aisles, a transept with apses on each arm, and a polygonal apse. The nave is 39 m long, while the apse is 15.30 m high. Its organ dates from the 18th century.

In the 19th century, the church was renovated by Paul Abadie.

Gallery

See also
Plantagenet style
Bordeaux Cathedral

References

Sainte-Croix
Sainte-Croix
Romanesque architecture in France
Chemin Neuf Community